George Darby (1798 – 16 November 1877) was a British Conservative politician.

He was educated at Westminster School and Catharine Hall, Cambridge.

He died 16 November 1877 in Piccadilly, London.

References

External links
 

UK MPs 1837–1841
UK MPs 1841–1847
Conservative Party (UK) MPs for English constituencies
1798 births
1877 deaths
People educated at Westminster School, London
Alumni of St Catharine's College, Cambridge